Pareiorhaphis splendens is a species of catfish in the family Loricariidae. It is native to South America, where it occurs in coastal drainage basins in the states of Paraná and Santa Catarina in Brazil, with its type locality being listed as the Cubatão River. The environment in which the species occurs is characterized by clear, fast-flowing water and a rocky substrate. It is typically found in small crevices between loose stones. The species reaches 6.5 cm (2.6 inches) in standard length and is believed to be a facultative air-breather.

References 

Loricariidae
Catfish of South America
Fish described in 1995
Fish of Brazil